Ben Aziz Ismaël Zagrè (born 21 December 1992), is a Burkinabé footballer who currently plays for Salitas in the Burkinabé Premier League.

Career statistics

Club

International

Statistics accurate as of match played 4 September 2019

International goals
Scores and results list Burkina Faso goal tally first.

References

1992 births
Living people
Burkinabé footballers
Burkina Faso international footballers
Burkinabé expatriate footballers
Expatriate footballers in Armenia
Ulisses FC players
Association football defenders
21st-century Burkinabé people
KOZAF players